A strange loop is a cyclic structure that goes through several levels in a hierarchical system. It arises when, by moving only upwards or downwards through the system, one finds oneself back where one started.
Strange loops may involve self-reference and paradox. The concept of a strange loop was proposed and extensively discussed by Douglas Hofstadter in Gödel, Escher, Bach, and is further elaborated in Hofstadter's book I Am a Strange Loop, published in 2007.

A tangled hierarchy is a hierarchical consciousness system in which a strange loop appears.

Definitions 
A strange loop is a hierarchy of levels, each of which is linked to at least one other by some type of relationship.  A strange loop hierarchy is "tangled" (Hofstadter refers to this as a "heterarchy"), in that there is no well defined highest or lowest level; moving through the levels, one eventually returns to the starting point, i.e., the original level.  Examples of strange loops that Hofstadter offers include: many of the works of M. C. Escher, the Canon 5. a 2 from Bach's Musical Offering, the information flow network between DNA and enzymes through protein synthesis and DNA replication, and self-referential Gödelian statements in formal systems.

In I Am a Strange Loop, Hofstadter defines strange loops as follows:

And yet when I say "strange loop", I have something else in mind — a less concrete, more elusive notion. What I mean by "strange loop" is — here goes a first stab, anyway — not a physical circuit but an abstract loop in which, in the series of stages that constitute the cycling-around, there is a shift from one level of abstraction (or structure) to another, which feels like an upwards movement in an hierarchy, and yet somehow the successive "upward" shifts turn out to give rise to a closed cycle. That is, despite one's sense of departing ever further from one's origin, one winds up, to one's shock, exactly where one had started out. In short, a strange loop is a paradoxical level-crossing feedback loop. (pp. 101-102)

In cognitive science 
According to Hofstadter, Strange loops take form in human consciousness as the complexity of active symbols in the brain inevitably leads to the same kind of self-reference which Gödel proved was inherent in any complex logical or arithmetical system in his incompleteness theorem. Gödel showed that mathematics and logic contain strange loops: propositions that not only refer to mathematical and logical truths, but also to the symbol systems expressing those truths. This leads to the sort of paradoxes seen in statements such as "This statement is false," wherein the sentence's basis of truth is found in referring to itself and its assertion, causing a logical paradox.

Hofstadter argues that the psychological self arises out of a similar kind of paradox. We are not born with an "I" – the ego emerges only gradually as experience shapes our dense web of active symbols into a tapestry rich and complex enough to begin twisting back upon itself. According to this view the psychological "I" is a narrative fiction, something created only from intake of symbolic data and its own ability to create stories about itself from that data.  The consequence is that a perspective (a mind) is a culmination of a unique pattern of symbolic activity in our nervous systems, which suggests that the pattern of symbolic activity that makes identity, that constitutes subjectivity, can be replicated within the brains of others, and perhaps even in artificial brains.

Strangeness 
The "strangeness" of a strange loop comes from our way of perceiving, because we categorize our input in a small number of "symbols" (by which Hofstadter means groups of neurons standing for one thing in the outside world). So the difference between the video-feedback loop and our strange loops, our "I"s, is that while the former converts light to the same pattern on a screen, the latter categorizes a pattern and outputs its essence, so that as we get closer and closer to our essence, we get further down our strange loop.

Downward causality 
Hofstadter thinks our minds appear to us to determine the world by way of "downward causality", which refers to a situation where a cause-and-effect relationship in a system gets flipped upside-down.  Hofstadter says this happens in the proof of Gödel's incompleteness theorem:
Merely from knowing the formula's meaning, one can infer its truth or falsity without any effort to derive it in the old-fashioned way, which requires one to trudge methodically "upwards" from the axioms.  This is not just peculiar; it is astonishing.  Normally, one cannot merely look at what a mathematical conjecture says and simply appeal to the content of that statement on its own to deduce whether the statement is true or false. (pp. 169-170)
Hofstadter claims a similar "flipping around of causality" appears to happen in minds possessing self-consciousness.  The mind perceives itself as the cause of certain feelings ("I" am the source of my desires), while according to popular scientific models, feelings and desires are strictly caused by the interactions of neurons. 

The parallels between downward causation in formal systems and downward causation in brains are explored by Theodor Nenu (2022), together with other aspects of Hofstadter's metaphysics of mind. Nenu also questions the correctness of the above quote by focusing on the sentence which "says about itself" that it is provable (also known as a Henkin-sentence, named after logician Leon Henkin). It turns out that under suitable metamathematical choices (where the Hilbert-Bernays provability conditions do not obtain), one can construct formally undecidable (or even formally refutable) Henkin-sentences for the arithmetical system under investigation. This system might very well be Hofstadter's Typographical Number Theory used in Gödel, Escher, Bach or the more familiar Peano Arithmetic or some other sufficiently rich formal arithmetic. Thus, there are examples of sentences "which say about themselves that they are provable", but they don't exhibit the sort of downward causal powers described in the displayed quote.

Examples 

Hofstadter points to Bach's Canon per Tonos, M. C. Escher's drawings Waterfall, Drawing Hands, Ascending and Descending, and the liar paradox as examples that illustrate the idea of strange loops, which is expressed fully in the proof of Gödel's incompleteness theorem.

The "chicken or the egg" paradox is perhaps the best-known strange loop problem.

The "ouroboros", which depicts a dragon eating its own tail, is perhaps one of the most ancient and universal symbolic representations of the reflexive loop concept.

A Shepard tone is another illustrative example of a strange loop. Named after Roger Shepard, it is a sound consisting of a superposition of tones separated by octaves. When played with the base pitch of the tone moving upwards or downwards, it is referred to as the Shepard scale. This creates the auditory illusion of a tone that continually ascends or descends in pitch, yet which ultimately seems to get no higher or lower. In a similar way a sound with seemingly ever increasing tempo can be constructed, as was demonstrated by Jean-Claude Risset.

Visual illusions depicting strange loops include the Penrose stairs and the Barberpole illusion.

A quine in software programming is a program that produces a new version of itself without any input from the outside. A similar concept is metamorphic code.

Efron's dice are four dice that are intransitive under gambler's preference. I.e., the dice are ordered , where  means "a gambler prefers x to y".

Individual preferences are always transitive, excluding preferences when given explicit rules such as in Efron's dice or rock-paper-scissors; however, aggregate preferences of a group may be intransitive.  This can result in a Condorcet paradox wherein following a path from one candidate across a series of majority preferences may return back to the original candidate, leaving no clear preference by the group.  In this case, some candidate beats an opponent, who in turn beats another opponent, and so forth, until a candidate is reached who beats the original candidate.

The liar paradox and Russell's paradox also involve strange loops, as does René Magritte's painting The Treachery of Images.

The mathematical phenomenon of polysemy has been observed to be a strange loop.  At the denotational level, the term refers to situations where a single entity can be seen to mean more than one mathematical object. See Tanenbaum (1999).

The Stonecutter is an old Japanese fairy tale with a story that explains social and natural hierarchies as a strange loop.

See also 
 
 
 
 
 
 
 
  – Going back in time to kill one's own grandfather generates a circular contradiction
 
 
 
 
  - Paradox: One must already possess any given piece of knowledge, otherwise it could not be recognized when supposedly "discovered"

References

Citations

Sources 

Hierarchy
Paradoxes
Philosophical analogies
Self-reference